

fl

fla-fli
Flagyl
flamenol (INN)
Flarex
flavamine (INN)
flavodic acid (INN)
flavodilol (INN)
Flavored Colestid
flavoxate (INN)
Flaxedil
flazalone (INN)
flecainide (INN)
flerobuterol (INN)
fleroxacin (INN)
flesinoxan (INN)
flestolol (INN)
fletazepam (INN)
Flexeril
Flexicort
flezelastine (INN)
flibanserin (INN)
flindokalner (USAN)

flo
floctafenine (INN)
Flolan
Flomax
flomoxef (INN)
Flonase
flopristin (INN)
flopropione (INN)
florantyrone (INN)
florbetaben (18F) (INN)
florbetapir (18F) (USAN)
flordipine (INN)
floredil (INN)
florfenicol (INN)
florifenine (INN)
Florinef
Florone
Floropryl
flosatidil (INN)
flosequinan (INN)
flosulide (INN)
flotrenizine (INN)
flovagatran (INN)
Flovent
floverine (INN)
floxacrine (INN)
Floxin
floxuridine (INN)

flu

flua-fluc
fluacizine (INN)
flualamide (INN)
fluanisone (INN)
fluazacort (INN)
fluazuron (INN)
flubanilate (INN)
flubendazole (INN)
flubepride (INN)
flucarbril (INN)
flucetorex (INN)
flucicatide (18F) (USAN)
flucindole (INN)
fluciprazine (INN)
fluclorolone acetonide (INN)
flucloxacillin (INN)
fluconazole (INN)
flucrilate (INN)
flucytosine (INN)

flud-flui
fludalanine (INN)
Fludara
Fludara (Berlex Laboratories Inc.)
fludarabine (INN)
fludazonium chloride (INN)
fludeoxyglucose (18F) (INN)
fludiazepam (INN)
fludorex (INN)
fludoxopone (INN)
fludrocortisone (INN)
fludroxycortide (INN)
flufenamic acid (INN)
flufenisal (INN)
flufosal (INN)
flufylline (INN)
flugestone (INN)
Fluidil
fluindarol (INN)
fluindione (INN)

flum-flun
Flumadine
flumazenil (INN)
flumecinol (INN)
flumedroxone (INN)
flumequine (INN)
flumeridone (INN)
flumetasone (INN)
flumethiazide (INN)
flumetramide (INN)
flumexadol (INN)
flumezapine (INN)
fluminorex (INN)
flumizole (INN)
flumoxonide (INN)
flunamine (INN)
flunarizine (INN)
flunidazole (INN)
flunisolide (INN)
flunitrazepam (INN)
flunixin (INN)

fluo
flunoprost (INN)
flunoxaprofen (INN)
Fluocet
fluocinolone acetonide (INN)
fluocinonide (INN)
fluocortin (INN)
fluocortolone (INN)
Fluohexal (Hexal Australia) [Au]. Redirects to fluoxetine.
Fluonid
Fluor-Op
fluoresone (INN)
Fluorine F-18
fluorodopa
fluorodopa (18F) (INN)
fluorometholone (INN)
Fluoroplex
fluorouracil (INN)
Fluothane
fluotracen (INN)
Fluotrex
fluoxetine (INN)
fluoxymesterone (INN)

flup-fluq
fluparoxan (INN)
flupentixol (INN)
fluperamide (INN)
fluperlapine (INN)
fluperolone (INN)
fluphenazine (INN)
flupimazine (INN)
flupirtine (INN)
flupranone (INN)
fluprazine (INN)
fluprednidene (INN)
fluprednisolone (INN)
fluprofen (INN)
fluprofylline (INN)
fluproquazone (INN)
fluprostenol (INN)
fluquazone (INN)

flur-flus
fluradoline (INN)
flurantel (INN)
flurazepam (INN)
flurbiprofen (INN)
fluretofen (INN)
fluripiridaz (18F) (USAN)
flurithromycin (INN)
flurocitabine (INN)
flurofamide (INN)
flurotyl (INN)
fluroxene (INN)
flusalan (INN)
flusoxolol (INN)
fluspiperone (INN)
fluspirilene (INN)

flut-fluz
flutamide (INN)
flutazolam (INN)
flutemazepam (INN)
flutemetamol (18F) (INN)
Flutex
flutiazin (INN)
fluticasone (INN)
flutizenol (INN)
flutomidate (INN)
flutonidine (INN)
flutoprazepam (INN)
flutrimazole (INN)
flutroline (INN)
flutropium bromide (INN)
fluvastatin (INN)
fluvoxamine (INN)
fluzinamide (INN)
fluzoperine (INN)